Football at the 2015 Palarong Pambansa was held at the Davao del Norte Sports Complex and at Energy Park, both in Tagum, Davao del Norte. There is no tournament for girls held in this edition.

Medal summary

Medal table

Medalists

Secondary
Western Visayas won the gold medal at the secondary division. They last achieved the same feat at the 2008 Palarong Pambansa Striker, Jed Deliarte of Western Visayas was named Most Valuable Player.

Group stage

Group A

Group B

Group C

Group D

Knockout stage

Quarter-finals

Semi-finals

Third-place play-offs

Final

References

External links
Competition Schedule – Elementary
Competition Schedule – Secondary
Palarong Pambansa